Perry's Lookdown is situated on the edge of the Grose Valley in the Blue Mountains, Australia. It is believed to have been named by Frederick Eccleston Du Faur after either Samuel Augustus Perry or a local innkeeper. Free campsites (five individual sites) are adjacent to the car park. The Blue Gum Forest is often accessed by foot from here, 656 vertical metres below the lookdown. The road to Blackheath is unsealed.

References 

Blue Mountains (New South Wales)
Parks and reserves of the Blue Mountains (New South Wales)
Blackheath, New South Wales